Volucella zonaria, the hornet mimic hoverfly, is a species of hoverfly. These flies are capable of buzz pollination.

Distribution
This species is present in most of Europe, in Tunisia, Iran, Russia (to Far East) and in Mongolia.

In Great Britain, it was only known from two specimens prior to 1940, so was regarded as rare. Since then, it has become increasingly widespread in many parts of the South and South East England, often in association with parks and gardens, where adults are usually seen visiting flowers. Elsewhere in England, only a few scattered records exist.

Habitat
These hoverflies usually inhabit meadows close to forests.

Description

These very large and wide hoverflies have reddish-brown shining thorax with dark brown marks, and a reddish-brown scutellum. The head shows a  waxy yellow face, with yellow forehead and antennae. The large ovoid compound eyes are reddish with dense and short hairy. In the males they are very close to each other, so that the forehead is very narrow. The abdomen is reddish yellow, with two wide black bands. The underside has broad black bars. The first abdominal segment is black. The second tergite is chestnut brown. Wings are amber infused. The legs are basically red-brown, but  black at the base.

This species mimics the European hornet (Vespa crabro), by its size, by its appearance and its buzzing flight.

Biology

Adults can be found from May to September, but they are most common in July / August. Like all Volucella, the adults of these hoverflies are migratory. Volucella zonaria is a Mediterranean migratory species. These hoverflies  mainly feed on nectar of flowers of various plants, especially Valeriana, Oregano, Mentha longifolia, Scabiosa, Cornus, Ligustrum, Cirsium, Carduus, Buddleia  and various other flowering shrubs. Females lay their eggs in wasp and hornet nests. The larvae live as commensals in nests of bees, hornets and of social wasps of the genus Vespula. The pupae overwinter in the soil and hatch in following spring.

References

External links
 
 The Wildlife Trusts
 Urban Pollinators

Diptera of Africa
Diptera of Asia
Diptera of Europe
Volucella
Insects described in 1761
Articles containing video clips
Taxa named by Nikolaus Poda von Neuhaus